Nesquehoning High School is a historic high school located at Nesquehoning, Carbon County, Pennsylvania. It was built between 1917 and 1919, and is a four-story, seven bay, school building in the Classical Revival style. It is constructed of structural terra cotta and faced with Roman brick. It measures 75 feet wide and 135 feet deep. The school closed in the 1960s and was renovated into apartments in 1998.

It was added to the National Register of Historic Places in 2003.

References

School buildings on the National Register of Historic Places in Pennsylvania
Neoclassical architecture in Pennsylvania
School buildings completed in 1919
Buildings and structures in Carbon County, Pennsylvania
National Register of Historic Places in Carbon County, Pennsylvania
1919 establishments in Pennsylvania